Ivana Chubbuck is an American acting coach who heads a drama school in Los Angeles and also hosts acting workshops worldwide.

She is the author of the best-selling book, The Power of the Actor, published by a division of Penguin Books (Gotham). The book has been translated into 18 languages.

Chubbuck originally worked as an actress before becoming an acting coach.

Notable students

Personal life 
Chubbuck was married to Lyndon Chubbuck, director of War Bride, until his death in 2021. She has a daughter named Claire.

References

External links 

Living people
American acting coaches
People from Greater Los Angeles
Year of birth missing (living people)